Goeppertia kegeljanii is a species of flowering plant in the family Marantaceae. Native to Espírito Santo in Brazil, it is commonly also known by its synonym Calathea musaica in the houseplant trade. As an ornamental plant, it is noted for its light green, oval leaves with a fine network of patterning.

Cultivars 
The following list of cultivars is incomplete.
 G. kegeljanii 'Network'

References 

kegeljanii
House plants